The discography of Danish singer Jon Nørgaard comprises two studio albums and eight singles.

In 2003, he released his debut album This Side Up, written by Søren Rasted. The album sold 135,000 copies and resulted in two successful singles, "Right Here Next to You" and "This Side Up". The album was also reissued in an international edition in 2003. In 2004, under the alias John Rock, he began a successful collaboration with house duo Musikk with a number of #1 singles on the Danish Dance Chart. Among the hits was a cover version of the Climie Fisher song "Love Changes (Everything)"; it peaked to #2 on the Danish Singles Chart. In 2005, Nørgaard returned as a solo artist with the single "Popstar", which was written by Swedish singer Robyn. That same year he released his second solo studio album Today is a Good Day (To Fall in Love). He released his solo Danish language single in May 2007, entitled "Lidt endnu" (meaning Just yet). In August 2007 landed a job as a radio host on commercial station Radio ABC in the program Mads og Jon. In 2010, Nørgaard appeared on Kato's hit single "Turn the Lights Off" from the album Discolized. He also collaborated with Clemens in the hit "Champion", reaching the top of the Danish Singles Chart. In March 2011, Nørgaard released "Dine Øjne", reaching number 14 on the Danish Singles Chart. In June 2011, he released "Fester Kun Med Mig Selv", reaching number 39 on the Danish Singles Chart. He features in the single "Vi Ejer Natten" with Clemens and Hedegaard, which was released in December 2011; it entered the Danish Singles Chart at number 14. His third solo album, Ved Siden Af Dig, will be released on 12 February 2012.

Albums

Singles

As Lead artist

As featured artist

Other songs

References

External links
Jon Nørgaard on Facebook
Jon Nørgaard on Twitter
Jon Nørgaard on YouTube
Jon Nørgaard on Myspace
Jon Nørgaard on Discogs

Discographies of Danish artists
Pop music discographies